Ammovouno (Greek: Αμμόβουνο) is a village in the Evros regional unit of northeastern Greece. Ammovouno is in the municipal sear of Orestiada and is located on the right bank of the river Ardas. In 2011 the village had a population of 113.

History
Prior to 1920 the village was called Samona.

References

Populated places in Evros (regional unit)